Coger is a surname. Notable people with the surname include:
Claude Coger, American newspaper owner, namesake of Coger House in Arkansas
Dalvan Coger, American professor of African Studies and Science Fiction fan, namesake of Darrell Awards Dal Coger Memorial Hall of Fame
Emma Coger, 19th-century African-American teacher, plaintiff in discrimination case Coger v. The North Western Union Packet Co.
Irene Coger, actor in American romance drama film Foxfire Light (1982)
Lara Petusky Coger, American journalist and television producer
Robin Coger, American biomedical engineer and academic administrator
Tyrek Coger, American basketball player and adopted brother of Rodney Purvis, named to 2016–17 Oklahoma State Cowboys basketball team, collapsed and died in a workout before joining team

See also
Cogers, a British free speech society
Cogger, another surname